Roudná is a municipality and village in Tábor District in the South Bohemian Region of the Czech Republic. It has about 600 inhabitants.

Administrative parts
The village of Janov is an administrative part of Roudná.

References

Villages in Tábor District